Tephris melanochreella is a species of moth in the family Pyralidae. It was described by Émile Louis Ragonot in 1887. This moth is found in Turkmenistan.

References

Moths described in 1887
Phycitini
Moths of Asia